Kevin Potter is a New Zealand former professional rugby league footballer who represented New Zealand in the 1975 World Cup, although he did not play in a match at the tournament.

He played for the Maritime club in the Auckland Rugby League competition.

References

Living people
New Zealand rugby league players
New Zealand national rugby league team players
Auckland rugby league team players
Rugby league centres
Maritime rugby league team players
Year of birth missing (living people)
Place of birth missing (living people)